Paracas or variation, may refer to:

Places
 Paracas Peninsula, located in the Ica Region of Peru
 Paracas Bay, located in the Pisco Province of the Ica Region in Peru
 Paracas (municipality), the capital city of the Paracas District
 Paracas District, located in the Pisco Province of the Ica Region in Peru
 Paracas National Reserve

Paracas civilization
 Paracas culture, an Andean society that existed in Peru between approximately 750 BC and 100 AD
 Paracas Candelabra, a prehistoric geoglyph on the Paracas Peninsula
 Paracas textile

Other uses
 Hotel Paracas, Pisco, Peru; a luxury resort hotel
 Savo Parača, president of the basketball club KK Lovćen
 Nikola Parača (born 1999), basketball player on the KK Lovćen
 Paraca (racehorse), winner of the 2003 Birthday Card Stakes, 2004 D.C. McKay Stakes

See also

 Paracas–Arequipa–Antofalla terrain, a geological unit of the Central Andes
 Nazca (disambiguation), including the post-Paracas